Phytoecia tenuilinea is a species of beetle in the family Cerambycidae. It was described by Léon Fairmaire in 1877. It is known from Morocco and Algeria.

Subspecies
 Phytoecia tenuilinea tenuilinea Fairmaire, 1877
 Phytoecia tenuilinea mateui Breuning, 1951

References

Phytoecia
Beetles described in 1877